Gloria Hallelujah Woods (born July 28, 1999), known professionally as GloRilla, is an American rapper from Memphis, Tennessee. She rose to prominence after releasing her 2022 song "F.N.F. (Let's Go)" (with Hitkidd), which was nominated for Best Rap Performance at 65th Annual Grammy Awards. Her single "Tomorrow 2" (featuring Cardi B), reached the top ten on the Billboard Hot 100.

Early life 
Gloria was born July 28, 1999, in the Frayser neighborhood of Memphis, Tennessee. She was home schooled until 5th grade. She started rapping when she was 16. She graduated from Martin Luther King College Prep.

Growing up she was a part of her church's choir, as a result, Woods initially wanted to be a singer, but after losing her voice, she decided to switch to rap. She also considered the stage name "Big Glo". Her cousin helped her come up with her stage name. She is the eighth out of 10 children born on her mother's side.

Career 
Woods released her mixtape album Most Likely Up Next in 2019 and her EP P Status in 2020.

In April 2022, Woods found increased fame and popularity with the release of "F.N.F. (Let's Go)" with producer Hitkidd. The song went viral and led to a #FNFChallenge on TikTok. A remix of the song featuring Latto and JT was released in September 2022, with the announcement that a remix with Saweetie would follow. The song led Woods to be nominated for two awards at the 2022 BET Hip Hop Awards, where she also performed in October 2022.

In June 2022, Woods and Duke Deuce released the song "Just Say That."

In July 2022, Woods signed with fellow Memphis rapper Yo Gotti's record label Collective Music Group. She was featured on the compilation album Gangsta Art.

In September 2022, Woods released the song "Tomorrow 2" featuring Cardi B.

In November 2022, GloRilla dropped her EP Anyways, Life's Great...

GloRilla was featured along with rapper Gangsta Boo on Latto's single "FTCU" ("Fuck the Club Up") in early December 2022.

In January 2023, she and labelmate Moneybagg Yo collaborated on the single "On Wat U On".

In February 2023, a stampede at a concert at the Main Street Armory in Rochester, New York resulted in 3 deaths and 7 people injured. The stampede started after audience members thought they heard gunshots while people were leaving the venue.

Artistry 
GloRilla describes her music as "crunk and dominant". Woods was inspired by Chief Keef.

Philanthropy 
In September 2022, Woods returned to her high school Martin Luther King College Prep in Memphis, Tennessee to donate $25,000.

Discography

EPs

Mixtapes

Compilation albums

Singles

As lead artist

As featured artist

Awards and nominations

Notes

References 

Living people
Rappers from Memphis, Tennessee
African-American women rappers
American women rappers
1999 births
Southern hip hop musicians